Two ships of the United States Navy have been named  for Manistee, Michigan - a Native American word meaning island in the river.

, a district harbor tug that served during World War II
, a large district harbor tug in active service

United States Navy ship names